Louis F. Zarza (August 15, 1909 – April 13, 1990) was an American football player and coach. He served as the head football coach St. Viator College Bourbonnais, Illinois in 1927 and at Wayne University—now known as Wayne State University—in Detroit, Michigan from 1949 to 1954, compiling a career college football coaching record of 26–31–3. Zarza went to Wayne after working for one season as the line coach for the Detroit Lions of the National Football League (NFL).

Head coaching record

College

References

1909 births
1990 deaths
American football ends
Arizona Wildcats football coaches
Detroit Lions coaches
Michigan State Spartans football coaches
Michigan State Spartans football players
Santa Clara Broncos football coaches
St. Viator Irish football coaches
Wayne State Warriors football coaches
College boxing coaches in the United States
High school football coaches in Indiana
Sportspeople from East Chicago, Indiana
Players of American football from Indiana